Keith Martin Dowding (born 6 May 1960) is Distinguished Professor of Political Science and Political Philosophy, School of Politics and International Relations, Research School of Social Sciences at the Australian National University, Canberra, Australia. He was in the Government Department at the London School of Economics, UK in 2006. He has published widely in the fields of public choice, public administration, public policy, British politics, comparative politics, urban political economy, positive political theory and normative political philosophy. His work is informed by social and rational choice theories. He edited the SAGE Publishing Journal of Theoretical Politics from 1996 to 2012.

Early life 
Dowding obtained his BA in Philosophy and Politics from Keele University in 1982, and a DPhil from Nuffield College, Oxford University in 1987.

Introduction to works 

Keith Dowding works in political philosophy and mainstream empirical political science. Dowding is best known for his work on "power", applying insights from formal analysis to central debates on the nature of power and structure of power in society. Expanding on Brian Barry's concept of "luck" (getting what you want without trying) he argues that some groups of people are "systematically lucky" in that they are advantaged because of the way society is structured. Such people are not powerful in the sense they have resources that they could use that other groups do not (though they might have this power as well) but rather systematically lucky in that they tend to get what they want without having to do anything. Alternatively, other groups are systematically unlucky. This argument has caused great controversy with critics including Brian Barry, Steven Lukes, Peter Morriss and more recently Andrew Hindmoor.

Dowding has also worked on the Tiebout model of individuals moving location to get the local services they require, showing that such moving does occur in the UK though only to a small extent, and that people tend to move to areas for service reasons, but do not decide to leave from areas for those reasons. He has extended this work into examining Albert Hirschman's Exit, Voice and Loyalty Model and has a forthcoming Cambridge University Press book Exits, Voices and Social Investment co-authored with long-time collaborator Peter John extending and applying Hirschman's model to citizen satisfaction with government services.

Dowding also considered the theory of presidentialisation of British politics in his 2012 article, “The Prime Ministerialization of the British Prime Minister”. The article challenges Michael Foley’s theory that British politics is becoming increasingly similar to that of a presidential system. Dowding instead suggests that the British prime minister is gaining power, but only enhancing the responsibilities that he already possesses rather than adopting new powers that are more closely attributed to the United States’ President.

More recently his work has examined why UK cabinet ministers resign based on a large dataset of all UK ministerial resignations and non-resignations, and compiled another on Australia. He is now working on a major project examining political careers in Australia.

Recent activity 
Dowding left LSE and joined the political science programme in the Research School of Social Sciences at the Australian National University (ANU) as a Research Professor of Political Science in July 2007 moving to the School of Politics and International Relations when the Arts Faculty coalesced with the Research School.

The Careers of Cabinet Ministers 
This project comes under the rubric of SEDEPE. Dowding’s work so far has largely been concerned with ministers in the British Cabinet and thus far largely concerned with their resignations.  But now he is working to extend this work into the careers of ministers more broadly, and to extend its scope beyond the UK most notably into ministers in the Australian states and Commonwealth government.  Publications from this project include the following:
 
 
 
 
 
 
 
  ; .
  .

Analytical Account of Freedom and Rights 
This is a joint work in collaboration with Martin van Hees.  The object is to complete a book on the measurement of freedom and rights. Publications from this project include the following:
 
 
 
 
Reprinted in

Work on Amartya Sen 
Dowding is fascinated by empirical measurement of freedom and rights. He has worked as part of a team led by Paul Anand, Open University, UK. They have been empirically examining Amartya Sen's capability approach through survey data ('Capabilities and Well-Being: Operationalizing the Capabilities Framework').  This research was supported by the UK Arts and Humanities Research Board. Currently he is writing a book on the works of Amartya Sen which is expected to be published soon.

Policy Agendas in Australia 
With Aaron Martin (Melbourne University) Dowding worked on the Australian franchise of the Policy Agendas and Comparative Agenda Project. His interest in methodology and explanation has led to a reflection on precisely what is being measured in these projects, as discussed in his Journal of Public Policy articles and opening chapters on the Policy Agendas in Australia book.

Publications

Books 
 
 
 
 
 
 
 
 
 
Volume I: Social choice, equilibrium and electoral systems
Volume II: Voting, elections and pressure politics
Volume III: Legislatures
Volume IV: Bureaucracy, constitutional arrangements and the state

References

External links 
 Dowding's web page at the ANU
 Power and the force of luck by Faizul Latif Chowdhury

1960 births
21st-century British philosophers
Academics of the London School of Economics
Alumni of Keele University
Alumni of Nuffield College, Oxford
Academic staff of the Australian National University
British political philosophers
British political scientists
British editors
Living people